Karl Klöckner (born 12 January 1915, date of death unknown) was a German cyclist. He competed in the team pursuit event at the 1936 Summer Olympics.

References

1915 births
Year of death missing
German male cyclists
Olympic cyclists of Germany
Cyclists at the 1936 Summer Olympics
Cyclists from Cologne
20th-century German people